The Architectural, Surveying, Planning and Landscape functional constituency  is a functional constituency in the elections for the Legislative Council of Hong Kong. It was first created in 1985 as Engineering, Architectural, Surveying and Planning for the first ever Legislative Council election in 1985 as one of the original 12 functional constituency seats. The constituency was divided into Engineering and Architectural, Surveying and Planning in 1991. In the 2016 election, the constituency was changed to its current name when the landscape architects were added to the electorates.

The constituency is composed of architects, landscape architects, surveyors, and planners and the members of Hong Kong Institute of Architects, Hong Kong Institute of Landscape Architects, Hong Kong Institute of Surveyors, and Hong Kong Institute of Planners entitled to vote at the general meetings of the associations. As of 2020, there are 9,096 registered voters. It is one of the few swing seats contested between the pro-Beijing and pro-democracy camps. It was first won by independent democrat Yiu Chung-yim in 2016 in a three-way contest against two pro-Beijing candidates, defeating pro-Beijing incumbent Tony Tse, but was soon disqualified for his oath-taking manner from the office. The vacancy was taken up by Tony Tse in the 2018 by-election.

Composition
The architectural, surveying, planning and landscape functional constituency is composed of—
 architects registered under the Architects Registration Ordinance; and
 members of The Hong Kong Institute of Architects entitled to vote at general meetings of the Institute; and
 landscape architects registered under the Landscape Architects Registration Ordinance; and
 members of The Hong Kong Institute of Landscape Architects entitled to vote at general meetings of the Institute; and
 professional surveyors registered under the Surveyors Registration Ordinance; and
 members of The Hong Kong Institute of Surveyors entitled to vote at general meetings of the Institute; and
 professional planners registered under the Planners Registration Ordinance; and
 members of The Hong Kong Institute of Planners entitled to vote at general meetings of the Institute.

Return members

Engineering, Architectural, Surveying and Planning (1985–1991)

Architectural, Surveying and Planning (1991–2016)

Architectural, Surveying, Planning and Landscape (2016–present)

Electoral results

2020s

2010s

2000s

1990s

1980s

References

Constituencies of Hong Kong
Constituencies of Hong Kong Legislative Council
Functional constituencies (Hong Kong)
1991 establishments in Hong Kong
Constituencies established in 1991